Cezmi Akdis is a medical researcher in the field of immunology. He is director of the Swiss Institute of Allergy and Asthma Research (SIAF) in Davos, Switzerland and the editor in chief of the journal Allergy. 

He has been a Professor in University of Zürich Medical Faculty since 2006, and one of the directors of the Christine Kühne-Center for Allergy Research and Education in Davos, Switzerland.

Education 
Akdis Received his medical degree from Uludag University Medical Faculty, Bursa, Turkey in 1985. He has specialized in infectious disease and clinical microbiology 1991 and in immunology at Uludag University in 1994, and further was named a Venia Legendi (Habilitation) at the University of Zürich 2001.

Publications 
Akdis has published more than 650 articles. His current h-index is 140. and 75,419 citations. He has also been selected to the ISI Web of Science and has received the Thomson Reuters (Clarivate) Highly Cited Researcher in the field of immunology in 2017, 2018, 2019, 2020 and 2021.

Academic history 
 President of the European Academy of Allergy & Clinical Immunology (14,000 members) between 2011-2013
 Executive Committee Member between 2003-2015 and Vice President between 2007-2011
 Senate Member of the Swiss Academy of Medical Sciences , 2014
 Editor of three Global Atlases. Allergy, Asthma, and Allergic Rhinitis and Chronic Rhinosinusitis
 Associate Editor 2007-2015 Journal of Allergy and Clinical Immunology
 Co-Editor-in-Chief 2015-2018 Journal of Allergy and Clinical Immunology
 Editor-in-Chief of Allergy 2018- present

Organizations 
 Founder and organizer of World Immune Regulation Meetings, Davos I-XIV (600-1000 participants)
 One of the founders and Past Chair of International Coalition in Allergy and Asthma (iCAALL), a presidents' network between 4 main organizations in the area of allergy and clinical immunology
 European Academy of Allergy and Clinical Immunology
 American Academy of Allergy Asthma and Immunology
 American College of Allergy and Clinical Immunology
 World Allergy Organization
 One of the founders and executive committee member of Global Allergy and Asthma European Network (GA2LEN).

Contributions 
 Immune regulation and allergen tolerance: Plasticity of antigen-specific T cells, 1996
 Human T-regulatory cells, 1998
 Immune suppressive role of histamine receptor 2, 2001
 Epithelial barrier studies: Mechanisms of eczema, 2000
 Human Type 2 NK cell subset, 2002
 Mechanisms of epithelial shedding in asthma and chronic rhinosinusitis, 2003 & 2009
 Human regulatory NK Cells, 2007
 Endotypes of asthma, 2011
 Chronic rhinosinusitis and atopic dermatitis, 2011
 Epithelial barrier hypothesis for the development of allergic and autoimmune disease, 2000-2022
 Regulatory Innate Lymphoid Cells, 2019

Honors 
 Ferdinand Wortman Prize, 1996
 Hoechst Marion Roussel Award, 1998
 Professor Hans Storck Award, 1998
 Dr.-Karl Heyer-Preis, 1998
 Sedat Simavi Medicine Award, 1998
 Allergopharma Award, 2001
 European Allergy Research “Gold Medal”, 2004
 TUBITAK Exclusive Award, 2007
 BUSIAD Award 2012
 World Allergy Organization Award, 2013
 AAAAI, Elliott Middleton Memorial Lecture, 2014
 European Federation of Immunology Societies, World Immunology Day Lectures, 2014
 Uzbekistan Academy of Sciences, 2015
 Capital University of Beijing, 2015
 Swiss Society of Allergy Immunology, 2017
 Honorary Professor in Capital Medical University, National Tongren Hospital, Beijing Institute of Otolaryngologology, China
 Honorary member of the Swiss Society of Allergy Immunology (SGAI-SSAI)
 Harold Nelson Memorial Lecture (AAAAI), 2021
 Erich Fuchs Prize (German Allergy Association), 2021
 Honorary Professor, Bursa-Uludag University, 2021

References 

Swiss immunologists
Academic journal editors
Academic staff of the University of Zurich
Bursa Uludağ University alumni
Year of birth missing (living people)
Living people
Turkish expatriates in Switzerland